Fokker V.8 was a five-winged aircraft built by Fokker for the Luftstreitkräfte during World War I.

After the initial success of the Fokker Dr.I triplane, Anthony Fokker proposed a quintuplane, reasoning that if three wings were good, five would be even better.  Reinhold Platz, chief engineer for Fokker, was at first shocked by the idea: further thought only strengthened this reaction.  Nevertheless, the aircraft was built.  Using some parts of the V.6, Platz designed a machine with three wings at the extreme front of the aircraft and a pair of wings midway along the fuselage, the mid-fuselage biplane wings placed where their leading edges were virtually even with the aft end of the cockpit coaming.  Balanced control surfaces were fitted to the upper wings, those at the front acting as conventional ailerons and those in the rear working with the elevators.

The pilot was seated just ahead of the biplane wings. Like the V.6, it was powered by a 120 hp (90 kW) water-cooled Mercedes engine.  Fokker, who was his own test pilot, made two brief flights in October 1917, after which it was abandoned. The Fokker V.8 was powered by a 119 kW (160 hp) Mercedes engine.

Platz regarded the aircraft as such a monstrosity that later on he would only speak of it reluctantly, and disliked its design being attributed to him.

References

Bibliography

Bowers, Peter M. and McDowell, Ernest R., "Triplanes," Motorbooks Ltd, Osceola WI, 1993, pages 106-107

Weyl, A.J. Fokker: The Creative Years. London: Putnam, 1965.

1910s German experimental aircraft
V.08
Tandem-wing aircraft
Single-engined tractor aircraft
Multiplane aircraft
Aircraft first flown in 1917